Hide & Seek is a 2007 Philippine horror film directed by Rahyan Carlos.

Plot
Oliver Aliciano (Eric Quizon), a college professor, began to leave Manila with his wife Leah (Jean Garcia), his rebellious stepdaughter Nica (Jennica Garcia) and her young brother Uno (Julijo Pisk) after he was blamed for the death of Ella Cabuena (Valeen Montenegro), Nica's best friend. After moving to an abandoned house to stay, they are troubled by ominous visions and hauntings.

At first they didn't mind the strange apparitions and continue to live like there's nothing else with them in the house. Later, they find out the real story of the house. Before, a rich family lived there and the husband had an affair with the maid, Dolor (Alessandra de Rossi) the husband of Dolor – Gener (Ryan Eigenmann) gets jealous and suspects that their daughter and her upcoming baby is not his.

So Gener confronted Dolor as she also admits that he has nothing to suspect because their daughter is his, but Gener didn't listen and as the struggles goes on Gener accidentally kills her daughter and also kills Dolor along with her unborn baby. Gener was killed later when the police tried to arrest him. After hearing the story Oliver and Leah find ways to stop the haunting but later they realize that the ghost of Dolor and her daughter only wants to help them and the ghost of Gener wants them killed like what he did to his family.

The ghost of Gener possesses Oliver and made him attacked every member of his family but because of the help of Dolor and her daughter, they stopped the ghost of Gener and free Oliver's body. It ends with them leaving the house to start a new life back in the city while Oliver is also acquitted from the accused murder and also getting to bond with his step daughter.

Cast
Eric Quizon as Oliver Aliciano
Jean Garcia as Leah Aliciano
Alessandra de Rossi as Dolor Buntag
Ryan Eigenmann as Gener Buntag
Mart Escudero as Joseph Dionisio
Jennica Garcia as Nica Aliciano
Valeen Montenegro as Ella Cabuena
Rubirubi as Andeng
Angel Sy as Tala Buntag
Julijo Pisk as Uno Aliciano

External links

See also
 List of ghost films

2007 horror films
2007 films
2000s Tagalog-language films
2000s English-language films
Philippine horror films
Regal Entertainment films
2007 multilingual films
Philippine multilingual films